Captain Nova is a 2021 Dutch science fiction family film. It was selected as the opening film for the 35th Cinekid Festival, where it won Best Children's Film and Best Dutch Children's Film. The film had a limited Dutch cinema-release in 2021 due to the COVID-19 pandemic and was released worldwide on Netflix in 2022.

De Volkskrant gave the film 4 out of 5 stars, praising the high quality of the film. Flemish newspaper Het Nieuwsblad gave the film 3 stars. The film will play at the 2022 Netherlands Film Festival.

References

External links 
 

2021 films
2020s Dutch-language films
Dutch science fiction films
Dutch adventure films
Dutch children's films